|}

The Prix de Guiche is a Group 3 flat horse race in France open to three-year-old thoroughbred colts. It is run over a distance of 1,800 metres (about 1⅛ miles) at Chantilly in May.

History
The event is named after Antoine IX (1789–1855), the Duc de Guiche (and later Duc de Gramont), who founded the successful Haras de Meudon stud farm.

The Prix de Guiche was established in 1865, and it was originally held at Longchamp. It was usually contested over 2,000 metres. It was cancelled because of the Franco-Prussian War in 1871. It was run over 2,200 metres in 1873.

The race was abandoned throughout World War I, with no running from 1915 to 1918. It was staged at Maisons-Laffitte in 1944 and 1945. It was cut to 1,950 metres in 1953.

With the exception of four editions over 1,850 metres (1963 and 1965–67), the event continued over 1,950 metres until 1986. It reverted to 1,850 metres in 1987. It was transferred to Chantilly and shortened to 1,800 metres in 2005.

The Prix de Guiche can serve as a trial for the Prix du Jockey Club. Sixteen horses have won both races. The first was Consul in 1869, and the most recent was Vadeni in 2022.

Records
Leading jockey (8 wins):
 Yves Saint-Martin – Relko (1963), Jour et Nuit (1964), White Star (1965), A Tempo (1966), Antipode (1974), Top Ville (1979), Shakapour (1980), Yashgan (1984)

Leading trainer (9 wins):
 Tom Jennings – Equivoque (1866), Pompier (1868), Consul (1869), Braconnier (1876), Saint Christophe (1877), Colifichet (1878), Barde (1879), Muscadin (1880), Gourgandin (1881)

Leading owner (9 wins):
 Frédéric de Lagrange – Equivoque (1866), Pompier (1868), Consul (1869), Braconnier (1876), Saint Christophe (1877), Colifichet (1878), Barde (1879), Muscadin (1880), Gourgandin (1881)

Winners since 1979

Earlier winners

 1865:
 1866: Equivoque
 1867: Ruy Blas
 1868: Pompier
 1869: Consul
 1870: Heraut d'Armes
 1871: no race
 1872: Revigny
 1873: Boiard
 1874: Premier Mai
 1875: Chassenon
 1876: Braconnier
 1877: Saint Christophe
 1878: Colifichet
 1879: Barde
 1880: Muscadin
 1881: Gourgandin
 1882: Quolibet
 1883: Frontin
 1884: Little Duck
 1885: Reluisant
 1886: Luc
 1887: Pic
 1888: Bocage
 1889: Phlegethon
 1890: Pourpoint
 1891: Ermak
 1892: Avoir
 1893: Oeillet
 1894: Lahire
 1895: Merlin
 1896: Pas de Danse
 1897: Castelnau
 1898: Le Samaritain
 1899: Fourire
 1900: Governor
 1901: Le Heaume
 1902: Retz
 1903: Tigellin
 1904: Presto
 1905: Avanti
 1906: Moulins la Marche
 1907: Dihor
 1908: Grill Room
 1909: Negofol
 1910: Nuage
 1911: Rioumajou
 1912: Corton
 1913: Rabble
 1914: Kummel
 1915–18: no race
 1919: McKinley
 1920: Boscobel
 1921: Grazing
 1922: Lamartine
 1923: Saint Hubert
 1924: Rabican
 1925: Coram
 1926: Diplomate
 1927: Pescaro
 1928: Montezuma
 1929: Tuvari
 1930: Godiche
 1931: Nadir
 1932: De Beers
 1933: Minestrone
 1934: Rentenmark
 1935: William of Valence
 1936: Vatellor
 1937: Mousson
 1938: Cavallino
 1939: Bacchus
 1940: no race
 1941: Plaisir de France
 1942: Young Phalaris
 1943: Giaour
 1944: Ardan
 1945: Taiaut
 1946: Fasano
 1947: Koos
 1948: Royal Drake
 1949: Norval
 1950: Scratch
 1951: Sicambre
 1952: Fine Top
 1953: Seriphos
 1954: Beigler Bey
 1955: Hafiz
 1956: Astrologue
 1957: Saim
 1958: Alegrador
 1959: Saint Crespin
 1960: Kirkes
 1961: Freiburg
 1962: Tremolo
 1963: Relko
 1964: Jour et Nuit
 1965: White Star
 1966: A Tempo
 1967: Grandier
 1968: Vaguely Noble
 1969: Spring Song
 1970: Stintino
 1971: 
 1972: Vitaner
 1973: Lisaro
 1974: Antipode
 1975: Orante
 1976: Grandchant
 1977: President
 1978: Gay Mecene

See also
 List of French flat horse races

References

 France Galop / Racing Post:

 france-galop.com – A Brief History: Prix de Guiche.
 galop.courses-france.com – Prix de Guiche – Palmarès depuis 1980.
 galopp-sieger.de – Prix de Guiche.
 horseracingintfed.com – International Federation of Horseracing Authorities – Prix de Guiche (2018).
 pedigreequery.com – Prix de Guiche – Chantilly.

Flat horse races for three-year-olds
Chantilly Racecourse
Horse races in France
1865 establishments in France
Recurring sporting events established in 1865